Turner is a census-designated place (CDP) and the primary village in the town of Turner, Androscoggin County, Maine, United States. It is in the center of the town, situated on the Nezinscot River, a northeast-flowing tributary of the Androscoggin River. Maine State Routes 4 and 117 cross just west of the center of the village. Route 4 (Auburn Road) leads north  to Livermore Falls and south  to Auburn, while Route 117 leads northwest  to Buckfield and northeast 6 miles to Howes Corner in the northern part of the town of Turner.

Turner was first listed as a CDP prior to the 2020 census.

Demographics

References 

Census-designated places in Androscoggin County, Maine
Census-designated places in Maine